Quiver Creek is a stream in Mason County in the U.S. state of Illinois. It is a tributary of the Illinois River.

Quiver Creek derives its name from cuivre, the French word meaning "copper".

See also
List of rivers of Illinois

References

Rivers of Mason County, Illinois
Rivers of Illinois